Heathfield Knoll School and First Steps Day Nursery is a small independent non-denominational day school and day nursery in Wolverley, near Kidderminster in Worcestershire, England, for boys and girls aged three months to 18 years. The school is a registered charity, governed by a board of trustees, formed as the Heathfield Educational Trust in 1970.

The school is a member of the Independent Schools Association and the Independent Schools Council.

The School is divided into four sections. Upper School, Middle School, Lower School and Early Years.

Heathfield Knoll also have a head of safeguarding, as led by Teresa Stooksbury and office manager is Julie Onions.

History
Heathfield School has its origins in 1620, when Wolverley Grammar School was founded by William Sebright. This was renamed Sebright School in 1931, when it occupied new buildings on a greenfield site opened by the then local MP  Stanley Baldwin who  shortly  afterwards became prime minister. Financial  difficulties forced the school to close down in 1970, and its main premises became a state school (now Wolverley C E Secondary School). However, its junior section which had opened in 1961, remained in existence and has extended its age range back up to 18.

Heathfield now has an international affiliate in Bangkok, Thailand, the former Lord Shaftesbury School, now renamed Heathfield International.

In January 2017, Heathfield School and the Knoll School merged to create the current Heathfield Knoll School and First Steps Day Nursery.

Performance
All Heathfield's GCSE candidates achieved at least five A* to C grades in 2007 and again in 2008.

The school was inspected by the Independent Schools Inspectorate in September 2008. The report found that the school met its aims of providing a healthy balance of academic and extra-curricular activities. Pastoral care was described as "outstanding" and the school's relationship with the local community was also commended. Overall teaching was good, although access to computer facilities needed expanding. Literacy and numeracy skills were found to be strongly promoted. The curriculum was well planned. Test results were well above, and in maths and science far above, the national average. There had been achievements in sports, music and drama.

Old Wolvernians
Philip Clarke, Managing Director of Clamason Industries
Clare Irby, socialite and Guinness family heiress

See also 
List of English and Welsh endowed schools (19th century)

References

External links
 Heathfield School

Private schools in Worcestershire